Latukan volcano is a potentially active stratovolcano in the centre of a chain of young E-W-trending stratovolcanoes in northwest Mindanao, southeast of Lake Lanao, province of Lanao del Sur, island of Mindanao, in the Bangsamoro Autonomous Region in Muslim Mindanao.

The Philippine Institute of Volcanology and Seismology (PHIVOLCS) lists Latukan as an inactive volcano, without any indication as to why it considers Latukan to be inactive.

Like most volcanoes in southern Philippines, Latukan has not been well studied.

See also
 List of active volcanoes in the Philippines
 List of potentially active volcanoes in the Philippines
 List of inactive volcanoes in the Philippines
 Philippine Institute of Volcanology and Seismology

References 

Stratovolcanoes of the Philippines
Volcanoes of Mindanao
Mountains of the Philippines
Landforms of Lanao del Sur
Potentially active volcanoes of the Philippines
Pleistocene stratovolcanoes